Pushpavalli (3 January 1926 – 28 April 1991) was an Indian actress who predominently worked in Telugu and Tamil films. She entered the film industry as a child actress with a small role as young Sita in the film Sampoorna Ramayanam (1936). This was followed by a few more roles as child star. Pushpavalli later graduated to doing roles as an adult. Her biggest hit was the Telugu film Bala Nagamma (1942), where she played an important supporting role. Her 1947 film Miss Malini, where she played the lead role, received great critical acclaim from the intelligentsia, but flopped at the box office. She continued playing supporting roles well into the late 1960s.

She married I V Rangachari in 1940 but they began living apart from 1946. Later, Pushpavalli was in a relationship with actor Gemini Ganesan with whom she had two daughters, Rekha and Radha. Her elder daughter is the noted actress in Hindi film industry, Rekha.

Biography
Pushpavalli was born as 'Kandala Venkata Pushpavalli Tayaramma' into the Kandala family to Kandala Ramakotamma and Kandala Thathachary in Pentapadu village of West Godavari district, Andhra Pradesh (at that time in Madras Presidency). She entered the film industry as a child actress, credited as Pushpavalli Tayaramma, with a small role as young Sita in the film Sampoorna Ramayanam (1936, 8 August), shot in Rajamundry in the first Studio in Andhra Region, Durga Cinitone, which was released when she was only nine years old. She was paid Rs 300/- for a three-day shoot, which was a princely sum in those days. This was followed by a few more roles as child star, and Pushpavalli's income became important to her family. Due to these preoccupations, she spent significant time in film shooting, she missed out on schooling and had only a rudimentary education. She married a Lawyer named I V Rangachari in about 1940. However, the marriage did not last (circumstances are not known) and they began living apart from 1946. Pushpavalli had two children (Babji and Rama) from her marriage to Rangachari.

Pushpavalli graduated to doing adult roles with hardly any break from playing a child star. This was a necessity, because acting was the source of income for the family, and she could not afford to take a break. However, this continuity may have affected her acting career, and she was never really accepted as a leading lady. She did only a few roles as heroine, and in between did many films where she played the second lead. In all, she acted in around 20-25 Telugu and Tamil films (including child roles) and met with only moderate success. She was never a top-level star, nor did she receive any critical acclaim for her acting talents. Perhaps her biggest hit was the Telugu film Bala Nagamma (1942), where she played an important supporting role. Her 1947 film Miss Malini, where she played the lead role, received great critical acclaim from the intelligentsia, but flopped at the box office.

Miss Malini (1947) also marked the acting debut of Gemini Ganesan, her future consort. Pushpavalli next worked with Ganesan in the Tamil film Chakradhari (1948), where she was the heroine, and he played a small role. After this point, the situation reversed; Ganesan became a huge star and Pushpavalli started getting only supporting roles, her films as heroine having mostly flopped. She did a few more films with Ganesan, the two got along very well together, and entered into a relationship, despite the fact that both of them were married to other people (Ganesan had married his first wife Alamelu, known informally as Bobji, at a very young age and would remain married to Bobji until his death).

Pushpavalli and Ganesan had two daughters together in quick succession. The eldest of them is the Bollywood actress Rekha (born in 1954) and the younger is Radha, who briefly worked in Tamil movies before marrying and moving to the United States. Ganesan did not acknowledge paternity of the girls for several years, and was only an occasional visitor to Pushpavalli's house. The relationship deteriorated quickly and the couple was soon estranged. As early as 1955, before the birth of Radha, Ganesan had secretly married the famous actress Savitri, and that relationship was publicly acknowledged as a valid marriage. This was possible because until 1956, it was legally permissible for a Hindu man to have more than one wife. Since Savitri was unmarried, it was possible for her to become Ganesan's legal second wife. Since Pushpavalli was still legally married to Rangachari (divorce was not available to Hindus at all until 1956), that option was not available to her and it was impossible for her to marry anyone else. Some sources say Pushpavalli and Ganesan were married in Tirupathi.

After being estranged from Ganesan, Pushpavalli did a few more films, mostly minor roles, including a couple of Hindi films made by her old associates in the south Indian film industry. She did these roles in order to support her daughters, whom she brought up single-handedly in a very frugal way. Gemini Ganesan did not want to recognize Rekha as his daughter and give her a living. He rarely met both of his children with Pushpavalli. Pushpavalli subsequently married K. Prakash, a cinematographer from Madras, and she legally changed her name to K. Pushpavalli. She gave birth to two more children, Dhanalakshmi (who later married to the actor Tej Sapru) and the dancer Seshu (died 21 May 1991). Due to her mother's hectic acting schedule at the time, Rekha would often stay with her grandmother. Asked in an interview by Simi Garewal about her father, Rekha believed he was never even aware of her existence. She recalled that her mother often spoke about him and added that despite never having lived with him, she felt his presence all through.

The fact that Rekha became so successful in films was a source of great satisfaction to Pushpavalli, as was the fact that her second daughter, Radha settled very respectably in marriage to Syed Usman, a former Bollywood model in 1976. They reside in USA. Pushpavalli died in 1991 of ailments associated with diabetes in Madras. She was survived by her 6 children including son Babji, and daughter Rama with I. V. Rangachari; two daughters, Rekha and Radha by Gemini Ganesan; Dhanalakshmi and Seshu (died 21 May 1991) with K. Prakash.

Filmography

References

Bibliography

External links
 

Actresses in Tamil cinema
Actresses in Telugu cinema
Indian film actresses
20th-century Indian actresses
1926 births
1991 deaths
Actresses from Andhra Pradesh
People from West Godavari district